City of Wolverhampton College is a further education college located in Wolverhampton, West Midlands, England.

History
The college was formed in September 1999 as the result of a merger of Wulfrun College in Wolverhampton and Bilston Community College in Bilston.

Upon this merger, it was initially known as Wolverhampton College, but in the aftermath of Wolverhampton gaining city status in December 2000, it adopted its current title.

A campus has since opened on Wellington Road in Bilston, replacing the old Bilston Community College buildings nearby which had originally been the buildings of Bilston Girls High School.

The college offers courses to students from Wolverhampton and the surrounding area. Courses offered include NVQs, GCSEs, BTECs, A Levels and Access courses. In addition, the college offers some higher education courses in conjunction with the University of Wolverhampton.

Campuses
 Wellington Road Campus, Wellington Road, Bilston 
 Paget Road Campus, Paget Road, Wolverhampton
 Metro One Campus, Bilston Street, Wolverhampton
 Telford Campus, Stafford Park 4, Telford, Shropshire

It's intended that the Paget Road site will close in due course with students transferring to an expanded Metro One Campus coined "The City Learning Quarter".

Worcester Campus previously located 9-11 Copenhagen Street, Worcester, WR1 2HB, is no longer listed.

Notable students
 Liam Payne, X Factor finalist and member of boyband One Direction. Payne studied Music Technology at the college.
Sam Gumbley, known professionally as S-X, producer and singer. Gumbley studied Music Technology at the college.
 Garry Crawford, Professor of Sociology and author, University of Salford
 Lesley Whittle was a student at the college when, in 1975, she was kidnapped and murdered by Donald Neilson.  This was one of the most notorious crimes of the 1970s.

References

External links

 City of Wolverhampton College homepage

Further education colleges in the West Midlands (county)
Education in Wolverhampton
Educational institutions established in 1962
1962 establishments in England
Educational institutions established in 1999
1999 establishments in England